Keith Matthew Spurgeon (29 August 1932 – December 1984) was an English football player and manager.

Playing career
Spurgeon played for Tottenham Hotspur, Margate, Leytonstone, Folkestone Town, Herne Bay and Snowdown Colliery Welfare. In October 1960 he was hired as a coach by Clapton, where he also had been used as a player to cover for injuries, on at least one occasion.

Coaching career
Spurgeon was manager of Dutch clubs Ajax from 1961 to 1962, Blauw-Wit Amsterdam between 1962 and 1963, and again between 1964 and 1965. He also managed Heracles Almelo from 1963 to 1964, and AGOVV and he later coached the Libyan national side, the Dallas Tornado of the North American Soccer League, Belgian side K.V. Mechelen Swedish side AIK, Cypriot side APOEL, and Landskrona, also of Sweden.

Personal life
Keith was born in Borehamwood, the son of Phyllis Edith Brighton and Albert Edward Spurgeon. He was married to Sylvia May Goldsmith.

He died in Sweden in 1984, from motor neurone disease.

His son  became a golfer.

References

External links
 Profile

1932 births
1984 deaths
English footballers
English football managers
English expatriate football managers
Tottenham Hotspur F.C. players
Margate F.C. players
Leytonstone F.C. players
Folkestone F.C. players
Herne Bay F.C. players
Snowdown Colliery Welfare F.C. players
Clapton F.C. players
AFC Ajax managers
Blauw-Wit Amsterdam managers
Heracles Almelo managers
AGOVV Apeldoorn managers
Libya national football team managers
North American Soccer League (1968–1984) coaches
K.V. Mechelen managers
Lierse S.K. managers
AIK Fotboll managers
APOEL FC managers
Landskrona BoIS managers
Association football defenders
English expatriate sportspeople in the Netherlands
Expatriate football managers in the Netherlands
English expatriate sportspeople in Libya
Expatriate football managers in Libya
English expatriate sportspeople in the United States
Expatriate soccer managers in the United States
English expatriate sportspeople in Belgium
Expatriate football managers in Belgium
English expatriate sportspeople in Sweden
Expatriate football managers in Sweden
English expatriate sportspeople in Cyprus
Expatriate football managers in Cyprus
Association football coaches